Spiroplasma citri is a bacterium species and the causative agent of Citrus stubborn disease.

Its genome has been partially sequenced.

The restriction enzyme SciNI, with the cutting site 5' GCGC / 3' CGCG, can be found in S. citri.

Euscelis incisa can be used as a vector of the bacterium to experimentally infect white clover (Trifolium repens).

References

External links
Type strain of Spiroplasma citri at BacDive -  the Bacterial Diversity Metadatabase

Mollicutes
Bacterial citrus diseases
Bacteria described in 1973